Yalındamlar is a village in the Elazığ District of Elazığ Province in Turkey. Its population is 196 (2021). The village is populated by Kurds from the Parçikan tribe.

References

Villages in Elazığ District